Polyadenylate-binding protein-interacting protein 1 is a protein that in humans is encoded by the PAIP1 gene.

Function 

The protein encoded by this gene interacts with poly(A)-binding protein and with the cap-binding complex eIF4A. It is involved in translational initiation and protein biosynthesis. Overexpression of this gene in COS7 cells stimulates translation. Alternative splicing occurs at this locus and three transcript variants encoding three distinct isoforms have been identified.

Interactions 

PAIP1 has been shown to interact with PABPC1.

References

Further reading